was a Japanese photographer. He was a member of the Naniwa Photography Club.

References

Japanese photographers
1889 births
Year of death unknown